You're a Shadow is the second and final studio album by Hungry Kids of Hungary. The album was released in February 2013 via Stop Start. The album was produced by Wayne Connolly at Alberts Studios in Sydney, Australia.

Track listing

Charts

References

2013 albums
Hungry Kids of Hungary albums